Robert Kron (born February 27, 1967) is a Czech former professional ice hockey centre and currently the director of amateur scouting for the Seattle Kraken. He was formerly director of European scouting for the Carolina Hurricanes.

Career 
Kron was drafted in the fifth round, 88th overall, by the Vancouver Canucks in the 1985 NHL Entry Draft. He made his National Hockey League debut with the Canucks in the 1990–91 season.  In his NHL career, he would play for the Canucks, the Hartford Whalers/Carolina Hurricanes, and the Columbus Blue Jackets.

Kron appeared in 771 NHL games, scoring 144 goals and adding 194 assists.  He also appeared in 16 Stanley Cup playoff games, scoring two goals and recording three assists.

After his hockey career ended, Kron was hired by the Carolina Hurricanes as an amateur scout. Former Carolina Hurricanes teammate and current Seattle Kraken GM Ron Francis hired him as the team's director of amateur scouting in October 2020.

Career statistics

Regular season and playoffs

International

References

External links

1967 births
Living people
Carolina Hurricanes players
Carolina Hurricanes scouts
Columbus Blue Jackets players
Czech ice hockey left wingers
Czechoslovak ice hockey left wingers
HK Dukla Trenčín players
HC Kometa Brno players
Hartford Whalers players
Lukko players
Ice hockey people from Brno
Syracuse Crunch players
Vancouver Canucks draft picks
Vancouver Canucks players
Czechoslovak expatriate sportspeople in Canada
Czechoslovak expatriate ice hockey people
Czech expatriate ice hockey players in Canada
Czech expatriate ice hockey players in Finland
Czech expatriate ice hockey players in the United States